Te Pareihe  (?–1844) was a notable New Zealand tribal leader. Of Māori descent, he identified with the Ngāti Te Whatuiāpiti iwi.

References

1844 deaths
Ngāti Te Whatuiāpiti people
Year of birth missing